Među zvezdama (trans. Among the Stars) is the fourth studio album from Serbian and former Yugoslav rock band YU Grupa.

Među zvezdama is the band's first album recorded with the guitarist Nedžat Maculja and the drummer Dragan Micić, who replaced Ratislav Đelmaš. The album features the band's former member Bata Kostić as guest.

Track listing

Personnel
Dragi Jelić - guitar, vocals
Žika Jelić - bass guitar
Nedžat Maculja - guitar
Dragan Micić - drums

Guest musicians
Bata Kostić - guitar

Additional personnel
Siniša Škarica - producer
Franjo Berner - engineer
Mladen Rukavec - engineer
Branko Podbrežnički - recorded by
Danko Polić - design
Zoran Kršljanin - photography

References 
 EX YU ROCK enciklopedija 1960-2006,  Janjatović Petar;  
Među zvezdama at Discogs

External links 
Među zvezdama at Discogs

YU Grupa albums
1977 albums
Jugoton albums